Dundalk entered the 1981–82 season, having finished as runners-up to Athlone Town the previous season. They were the holders of both the League Cup and the FAI Cup, having achieved their first domestic cup double. In the process, they had qualified for the Cup Winners' Cup. 1981–82 was Jim McLaughlin's eighth season as manager, and was Dundalk's 56th consecutive season in the top tier of Irish football.

Season summary
The new season opened with the President's Cup, and Dundalk defeated Athlone 4–3 on aggregate to win it for the third season in a row. But the League Cup was surrendered in the first round, when County Louth neighbours Drogheda United defeated them on penalties. Later that season, they lost the Leinster Senior Cup final. The League schedule commenced on 10 September 1981, using a trial point system of 4 for an away win, 3 for a home win, 2 for an away draw, and 1 for a home draw. Dundalk started with five victories but, after they drew Tottenham Hotspur in the Second round of the Cup Winners' Cup, there was a wobble in League form with all eyes at Oriel Park on the upcoming glamour tie. They fell 10-points behind Bohemians, but subsequently charged to the title, sealing it on the final day away to defending champions Athlone. But it was Bohemians that came out of a four match, seven and a half hour FAI Cup semi-final marathon, depriving McLaughlin of a shot at a second League and Cup Double.

As FAI Cup holders from the season before, they qualified for the 1981–82 European Cup Winners' Cup. In the first round they drew Fram, and won through 5–2 on aggregate, with what remains their record victory in Europe – a 4–0 win in Oriel Park. In the second round, McLaughlin's unbeaten record in Europe at Oriel reached eight matches, when Tottenham Hotspur were held to a 1–1 draw. A 1–0 defeat in White Hart Lane ultimately ended their interest in the competition.

First-Team Squad (1981–82)
Sources:

a. Includes the Leinster Senior Cup and LFA President's Cup.

Competitions

LFA President's Cup
Source:

Dundalk won 4–3 on aggregate

League Cup
Source:
First round

Leinster Senior Cup
Source:
First Round

Quarter Final

Semi Final

Final

FAI Cup
Source:
First Round

Second Round

Quarter Final

Semi Final

Semi Final (first replay)

Semi Final (second replay)

Semi Final (third replay)

League
Source:

League table

Europe

Cup Winners' Cup
First round

Dundalk won 5–2 on aggregate.

Second round

Awards

Player of the Month

References
Bibliography

Citations

External links
Dundalk F.C. on YouTube
Tottenham Hotspur 1–0 Dundalk Highlights

Dundalk F.C. seasons
Dundalk